The Twinz are a hip hop duo from Long Beach, California, consisting of twin brothers Deon "Trip Locc" Williams and Dewayne "Wayniac" Williams. After working with Warren G on his debut album Regulate...G Funk Era, the Twinz released their only album Conversation in 1995. That same year, the Twinz performed their hit single, "Round & Round," on an episode of Nickelodeon's All That as well as the syndicated dance music show Soul Train.

In 1997 the duo appeared on Warren G's second album Take a Look Over Your Shoulder on the track "We Brings Heat". On Tha Eastsidaz 2000 debut album, Tha Eastsidaz, the Twinz were featured on the track "Dogghouse". In 2009 with the help of Snoop Dogg, Twinz released an EP titled Tha Loccs, which has five tracks. Four of them includes the rapper Lil' ½ Dead and three tracks include Snoop Dogg.

Discography

Studio albums

Extended plays
Tha Loccs (2009)

Singles

Soundtrack appearances

Guest appearances

Videography

Music videos

References

Hip hop groups from California
G-funk groups
Musicians from Long Beach, California
Gangsta rap groups